Naseriyeh-ye Bala (also Romanized as Nāşerīyeh-ye Bālā; also known as Nāşerīyeh and Nāsirīyeh) is a village in Kabutar Khan Rural District, in the Central District of Rafsanjan County, Kerman Province, Iran. At the 2006 census, its population was 839, in 184 families.

References 

Populated places in Rafsanjan County